Soleymanlu may refer to:
 Soleymanlu, East Azerbaijan